Flyer Command Iraq was a unit of the German Air Force (Luftwaffe) sent to Iraq in May 1941 as part of a German mission to support the regime of Rashid Ali during the Anglo-Iraqi War. The mission was part of a larger effort to gain support in the Middle East for the Axis Powers against the United Kingdom and its allies during World War II.

Background
On the 1st of April 1941, Rashid Ali and members of the "Golden Square" led a coup d'état in Iraq. During the time leading up to the coup, Rashid Ali's supporters had been informed that Germany was willing to recognize the independence of Iraq from the British Empire; there had also been discussions on sending matériel to support the Iraqis and other Arab factions in fighting the British.

German Foreign Minister Joachim von Ribbentrop persuaded Adolf Hitler on the 3rd of May that Dr. Fritz Grobba be secretly returned to Iraq to head up a diplomatic mission to channel support for the Rashid Ali regime. Grobba's mission was accompanied by a military force commanded by the Oberkommando der Wehrmacht, or OKW (the High Command of the Armed Forces). The military mission had the cover name Sonderstab F (Special Staff F); it included components from the Abwehr-based Brandenburgers and from the Luftwaffe. Sonderstab F was commanded by General der Flieger Hellmuth Felmy. Fliegerführer Irak (Flyer Command Iraq) was the Luftwaffe component of Sonderstab F, and while it was a part of the Sonderstab F military mission, it was also somewhat separate from it. Its personnel reported to the Luftwaffe High Command and not to the chief of the OKW.

On the 6th of May, in accordance with the "Paris Protocols", Germany concluded a deal with the Vichy French government to release war material, including aircraft, from sealed stockpiles in Syria, and to transport them to the Iraqis. The French also agreed to allow the passage of other weapons and stores, and to loan several airbases in northern Syria to Germany for the transport of their aircraft to Iraq.

Also on the 6th of May, Luftwaffe Oberst Werner Junck received instructions in Berlin that he was to take to Iraq a small force of aircraft, which came to be named Special Force Junck (Sonderkommando Junck). After meeting with Reichsmarschall Hermann Göring, Junck was named Commander of Aviation Iraq (Fliegerführer Irak). Junck was then briefed by Generalleutnant Hans Jeschonnek, Göring's chief of staff. While under Junck's tactical direction, Sonderkommando Junck was to be under the overall direction of Jeschonnek. The aircraft of Sonderkommando Junck had Iraqi markings and operated from an air base in Mosul, some 240 miles north of Baghdad.

Initial composition
Fliegerführer Irak was to consist of a squadron of Messerschmitt Bf 110 zerstörer heavy fighters (12 aircraft) from the 4. Staffel/ ZG 76, and a squadron of Heinkel He 111 bombers (12 aircraft). In addition, to assist in transporting the force to Iraq, Junck was lent 13 Junkers Ju 52/3m trimotor transports and Junkers Ju 90 four-engined transport aircraft. All but three of these transports had to be returned to Greece immediately to prepare for the invasion of Crete.

Junck was accompanied to Iraq by Major Axel von Blomberg. Von Blomberg's task was to head a reconnaissance group preceding the unit and to integrate Fliegerführer Irak with Iraqi forces in operations against the British.

Arrival

Dr. Grobba and his mission reached Aleppo in Syria on 9 May, accompanied by two Messerschmitt Bf 110s. They reached Baghdad on 11 May.

On the 13th of May, the bulk of Junck's force arrived in Mosul. The flight had taken the aircraft some 36 hours and covered 1200 miles. Over the following days, Junck's aircraft became increasingly frequent visitors to Baghdad.

Junck's transport aircraft began to stage through Aleppo to Mosul on the 14th of May. On this date, a further three Messerschmitt Bf 110s and three Heinkel He 111s arrived in Mosul. Due to damaged rear wheels, two over-loaded Heinkel He 111s were left in Palmyra in central Syria. British fighters illegally entered Vichy French air-space and strafed the disabled Heinkels.

On the 15th of May, Junck arrived in Mosul with a further nine aircraft. By the end of the day, he had assembled a force comprising 12 Messerschmitt Bf 110s, 5 Heinkel He 111s, a communications flight with light aircraft, a section of anti-aircraft guns, and 3 Junkers Ju 52s.

Activities
British forces had already begun to counterattack in Iraq.  By the 15th of May, Junck knew that "Habforce" was on its way to RAF Habbaniya and "Kingcol" had taken Rutba Fort. Junck sent a lone Heinkel bomber to find "Kingcol" at Rutba. The bomber found and attacked "Kingcol", which alerted the British to the German military assistance to the Iraqi regime.

On the same day, von Blomberg was sent by Junck to Baghdad to make arrangements for a council of war with the Iraqi government. The council was planned for the 17th of May. However, von Blomberg was killed by friendly fire from Iraqi positions. His Heinkel He 111 was shot at from the ground as it flew low on approach and von Blomberg was found to be dead upon landing.

Junck visited Baghdad in place of von Blomberg on the 16th of May. He met Dr. Grobba, Rashid Ali, General Amin Zaki, Colonel Nur ed-Din Mahmud, and Mahmud Salman. The group agreed on a number of priorities for Fliegerführer Irak. The first was to prevent Kingcol from reaching RAF Habbaniya. The second was for Iraqi ground forces to take Habbaniya with air support provided by Fliegerführer Irak. It was also very important to the Germans to provide the Royal Iraqi Army with a "spine straightening".  Much of the RIrA was known to be terrified of bombing by British aircraft.

On the same day, Junck arranged for a raid by Fliegerführer Irak on Habbaniya. Six Messerschmitt Bf 110s and 3 Heinkel He 111s attacked the base, which took the RAF personnel there by surprise. However, while a number of defenders were killed on the ground, the Germans lost a Heinkel in exchange for an Audax and a Gladiator.

On the 17th of May, three Messerschmitt Bf 110s attacked an extended column of Kingcol in the open desert. Luckily for the British, the fighters had not attacked the previous day when many vehicles were caught up to the axles in soft sand.

On the same day, the British Royal Air Force (RAF) paid Junck back with his own coin. Two cannon-firing, long-range Hawker Hurricanes which had arrived unannounced from Egypt, and six Bristol Blenheim bombers from 84 Squadron, struck the Germans at Mosul. For the loss of one Hurricane, two German aircraft were destroyed and four damaged. In addition, two Gladiator biplane fighters from Habbaniya encountered two Messerschmitt 110s attempting to take off from Rashid Airfield in Baghdad. Both Messerschmitts were destroyed.

By the 18th of May, Junck's force had been whittled down to 8 Messerschmitt Bf 110s, 4 Heinkel He 111s, and 2 Junkers Ju 52s. This represented a roughly 30 percent loss of his original force. With few replacements available, no spares, poor fuel, and aggressive attacks by the British, this rate of attrition did not bode well for Fliegerführer Irak. By the end of May, Junck had lost 14 Messerschmitts and 5 Heinkels.

Hitler, in support of the Iraqi insurrection, issued Führer Directive No. 30 on 23 May.

On the 27th of May, twelve Italian Fiat CR.42 biplane fighters of the Regia Aeronautica (Royal Italian Air Force) arrived in Mosul to operate under German command. By the 29th of May, Italian aircraft were reported over Baghdad. According to Winston Churchill, the Italian aircraft accomplished nothing. Other reports state that they actually arrived in time to take part in the final air battle of the Iraq campaign on the 29th of May, scoring victories against No. 94 Squadron RAF.

Grobba sent a panicked message from Baghdad to Berlin on the 28th of May reporting that the British were close to the city with more than "one hundred tanks". By then, Junck had no serviceable Messerschmitt Bf 110s and only two Heinkel He 111s with just four bombs between them.

The German military mission to Iraq left under cover of darkness on the 29th of May. Dr. Grobba himself fled Iraq the next day.

Commanders
 Lieutenant General Hans Jeschonnek – 6 May 1941 to 29 May 1941 (in Europe)
 Colonel Werner Junck – 6 May 1941 to 29 May 1941 (in Iraq)

See also

 Bombing of Palestine in World War II
 Syria-Lebanon Campaign
 Martin Drewes
 Paul Zorner
 Wilhelm Herget
 Foreign Affairs/Defence Office of the Armed Forces High Command (Abwehr)
 Kampfgeschwader 4
 Zerstörergeschwader 76

Footnotes

References
Citations

Bibliography

 
 in

External links

Irak
Irak
Luftwaffe Fliegerführer
Iraq in World War II
Germany–Iraq relations
Military units and formations established in 1941
Military units and formations disestablished in 1941